Ricardo Franco (24 May 1949 in Madrid – 20 May 1998 in Madrid) was a Spanish screenwriter and film director.

Biography 
Nephew of  Jesús Franco. He died at 49 years old when he filmed  Lágrimas negras.
He wrote lyrics for pop songs for Tam Tam Go!, "Manuel Raquel" hit for example. "Loco de amor" played  Café Quijano was written by Franco too.

Filmography

as film director 
Gospel, el monstruo (1969).
El desastre de Annual (1970).
El increíble aumento de la vida (1974).
Pascual Duarte (1975).
Los restos del naufragio (1978).
Disa, cincuenta aniversario (1983).
Gringo mojado (1984).
El sueño de Tánger (1985).
Berlín Blues (1988).
La mujer de tu vida (1988) (TV episode).
Crónicas del mal (1991) (TV).
La canción del condenado (1991).
¡Oh, cielos!" (1993).Después de tantos años (1994) (documentary)La buena estrella (1997).Lágrimas negras (1998).

 as screenwriter Adiós, pequeña (Imanol Uribe, 1986).Berlín Blues (1988).Sangre y arena (Javier Elorrieta, 1989).Tu nombre envenena mis sueños (Pilar Miró, 1996).La buena estrella (1997).Lágrimas negras (1998).

 as actor Amo tu cama, rica (Emilio Gutiérrez Lázaro, 1970).Los restos del naufragio (1977).Travelling Companion (1979)Pepi, Luci, Bom y otras chicas del montón (Pedro Almodóvar, 1980).La madre'' (Miguel Bardem, 1995).

External links
Ricardo Franco at  Internet Movie Database

Spanish male screenwriters
Spanish film directors
1949 births
1998 deaths
Best Director Goya Award winners
20th-century Spanish screenwriters
20th-century Spanish male writers